Stepstone can refer to:
 Step-stone bridge, a rudimentary bridge
 StepStone, an online careersite
 Stepstone, a now-defunct software company
Stepstone, Kentucky

See also
 Stepping stone (disambiguation)